Elaine Joyce (born Elaine Joyce Pinchot) is an American actress.

Early life and education
Elaine Joyce Pinchot was born in Cleveland, Ohio, of Hungarian ancestry, the daughter of Iliclina (née Nagy) and Frank Pinchot.

Career
She made her film debut in 1961 as an extra in West Side Story and made uncredited appearances in several musical films, including The Music Man, Bye Bye Birdie, and Funny Girl before being cast in Such Good Friends and How to Frame a Figg in 1971.

She made her television debut in an episode of Route 66 in 1962.  She was one of the dancers on The Danny Kaye Show. She also had recurring roles in The Young and the Restless and Days of Our Lives; made guest appearances in such series as The Andy Griffith Show; The Red Skelton Show; Love, American Style; The Carol Burnett Show; Kojak; Charlie's Angels; Green Acres; Hawaii Five-O; Quincy, M.E.; The Feather and Father Gang; The Love Boat; and $weepstake$.

In 1971, Joyce starred in the final episode of Green Acres as Oliver's former secretary, Carol Rush. The episode was a backdoor pilot, titled "The Blonde" or "Carol," which featured Joyce as a young, dizzy blonde who lives with her sister and brother-in-law in Los Angeles, and manages to save her no-nonsense boss, played by Richard Deacon, from a real estate scam. The pilot was not picked up.

She was also a regular panelist on several game shows, including Match Game, Tattletales, Super Password, Password Plus, What's My Line?, and I've Got a Secret.

In the 1976 television series City of Angels, she played Marsha Finch, the ditzy secretary to Los Angeles private eye Jake Axminster (Wayne Rogers), who ran a call girl service on the side. Joyce also hosted the first season (1986–87) of The All New Dating Game. Throughout the 1980s and 1990s, she was featured in many series, including Mr. Merlin (in which she portrayed the character Alexandra, a sorceress); Beverly Hills, 90210; Melrose Place; Magnum, P.I.; Simon & Simon; Too Close for Comfort; and Murder, She Wrote.

In 1972, she made her Broadway debut in the title role in Sugar, the musical adaptation of the film Some Like It Hot, in which she portrayed band singer Sugar Kane, the role originated by Marilyn Monroe in the movie. Joyce won the 1972 Theatre World Award for her performance.

Joyce also starred in the 1980 film Motel Hell as Edith Olsen and the 1986 film Trick or Treat as Angie Weinbauer, the mother of Eddie Weinbauer (Marc Price).

Personal life
Joyce was married to Bobby Van from 1968 until Van's death from brain cancer in 1980. In May 1982, Joyce performed at the Alhambra Dinner Theatre in Jacksonville, Florida. Reclusive author J. D. Salinger attended the opening night of the production to see Joyce and accompany her after the show. She told a reporter that it was the first time the two had met, but they had a romantic relationship for several years.

Joyce was married to television producer John Levoff from 1985 until their divorce in 1992. From September 1999 until his death, she was married to playwright Neil Simon, who died on August 26, 2018, from complications of pneumonia after being on life-support while hospitalized for kidney failure.

She has two children: a daughter, Taylor, with Bobby Van, and a son, Michael, with Levoff. Taylor attended Harvard-Westlake School in Los Angeles, where she met future husband Evan Meyer; they were married in October 2003, at which time she was employed as a television executive assistant for Paramount Pictures.

References

External links
 
 
Alexander, Paul.  "J. D. Salinger’s Women."  New York Magazine. February 1998.

American film actresses
American game show hosts
American musical theatre actresses
American television actresses
Living people
Actresses from Cleveland
American people of Hungarian descent
20th-century American actresses
Simon family
Year of birth missing (living people)